Housing Finance Bank (HFB) is a commercial bank in Uganda. It is one of the commercial banks licensed by Bank of Uganda, the national banking regulator.

Overview
HFB is a full service retail bank that is primarily involved in mortgage banking. Founded in 1967 as a housing finance company, HFB became a fully licensed commercial bank in January 2008, having acquired a commercial banking license from the Bank of Uganda. The bank is the leading mortgage lender in the country, with approximately 60 percent of all Ugandan mortgage accounts. As of December 2019, HFB had an asset base valued at USh912.48 billion  (US$247 million), with shareholders' equity of USh211.92 billion (US$57.3 million). On 31 December 2020, the bank's assets were USh1.11 trillion (US$315 million). The bank made an after-tax profit of USh20.6 billion (US$5.84 million) in 2020. At that time, shareholders' equity was USh250.1 billion (approx. US$70 million).

In August 2017, the two largest shareholders in the bank, the Uganda government and NSSF Uganda, each contributed $8.2 million (for a total of $16.4 million) in fresh capital, to boost the bank's ability to lend to more mortgage borrowers and improve the lender's liquidity.

Ownership
HFB is owned by the Uganda National Social Security Fund (50.0 percent). The government of Uganda, through the Uganda Ministry of Finance, Planning and Economic Development, owns 49.18 percent. The remaining 0.82 percent is owned by the National Housing and Construction Company, a parastatal company jointly owned by the government of Uganda (51 percent) and the government of Libya (49 percent).

HFB had planned to list its shares on the Uganda Securities Exchange in 2012, however, those plans were postponed.

Branch network
HFB maintains its corporate headquarters and main branch at its newly constructed headquarters building on Wampewo Avenue, on Kololo Hill. HFB's former main branch is located on Kampala Road.

Another branch within the Kampala central business district is located in Nakasero, across Nakasero Road from the Nigerian High Commission. There are two other branches in Kampala, one each in the suburbs of Namuwongo and Ntinda.

In February 2009, HFB opened a branch in Mbarara in western Uganda. In March 2009, HFB opened a branch in an area of Kampala known as Kikuubo. In June 2009, HFB opened a branch in Mbale, promising at the opening ceremony to launch Internet banking and rural mobile banking later in 2009. In July 2009, HFB opened a branch in Arua, its eighth in the country.

, HFB maintained branches at the following locations:

 Pearl Lounge Executive Banking Branch - 4 Wampewo Avenue, Kololo, Kampala
 Arua Branch - OB Plaza, 9-11 Adumi Road, Arua
 Fort Portal Branch - 4 Kyebambe Road, Fort Portal
 Garden City Branch - Garden City Mall, 64-68, Yusuf Lule Road, Kampala
 Gulu Branch - 26 Labwor Road, Gulu
 Jinja Branch - Beamteks Plaza, 68 Main Street, Jinja
 Kampala Road Branch - 25 Kampala Road, Kampala
 Kikuubo Branch - 15 Nakivubo Road, Kampala
 Kololo Branch - Investment House, 4 Wampewo Avenue, Kololo  Main Branch
 Lira Branch -  4 Bazaar Road, Lira
 Mbale Branch - Bugisu Cooperative Union House, 2 Court Road, Mbale
 Mbarara Branch - Classic Hotel Building, 57 High Street, Mbarara
 Mukono Branch - Mukono
 Najjanankumbi Branch - Pelican House, 1032 Entebbe Road, Najjanankumbi
 Nakasero Branch - 34A Nakasero Road, Nakasero, Kampala
 Namuwongo Branch -38 Kisugu Road, Namuwongo, Kampala
 Ndeeba Branch - 94-96 Masaka Road, Ndeeba, Kampala
 Ntinda Branch - 1 Kimera Road, Ntinda
 Ovino Branch - Ovino Market Mall, 22, Kibuga Road, Kisenyi, Kampala
 Tororo Branch - 11 Mbale Road, Tororo

Directors
Housing Finance Bank is governed by a twelve-person board of directors of whom two are executive directors and ten are non-executive. The chairman of the board is David Opiokello, one of the non-executive directors.

Executive management
Nicholas Okwir was the founding managing director of HFB. In April 2013, Mathias Katamba became managing director, succeeding the retiring Okwir. In October 2018, Katamba left and Michael Mugabi was named CEO in an acting capacity. There are eleven other senior managers with whom the managing director supervises the daily activities of the bank.

See also

List of banks in Uganda
Banking in Uganda
Patrick Ayota
Sarah Walusimbi

References

External links
Housing Finance Bank Homepage
Uganda: Housing Finance Readies for Agency Banking

Banks of Uganda
Banks established in 1967
1967 establishments in Uganda
Companies based in Kampala
Kampala Central Division
Housing finance companies
Government-owned companies of Uganda